Bright Edward Kodzo Demordzi (born December 18, 1972) is a Ghanaian politician and member of the Sixth Parliament of the Fourth Republic of Ghana representing the Bortianor/Ngleshie/Amanfro (new) Constituency in the Greater Accra Region on the ticket of the National Democratic Congress.

Personal life 
Demordzi is a Christian (Overcomers Praise Assembly International). He is married with three children.

Early life and education 
Demordzi was born on December 18, 1972. He hails from Anloga, a town in the Volta Region of Ghana. He entered Ghana Institute of Management and Public Administration and obtained his Master of Business Administration degree's in Marketing in 2009. He also attended Chartered Institute of Marketing (CIM UK) and obtained his professional postgraduate diploma in 2009.

Politics 
Demordzi is a member of the National Democratic Congress (NDC). In 2012, he contested for the Bortianor/Ngleshie/Amanfro (new) seat on the ticket of the NDC sixth parliament of the fourth republic and won.

Employment 
 Commercial Manager, Yara (Ghana), Limited, Airport - Accra
 PR/journalist/sdvertiser/marketer

References 

1972 births
Living people
National Democratic Congress (Ghana) politicians
Ghana Institute of Management and Public Administration alumni
Ghanaian MPs 2013–2017
Ghanaian MPs 2017–2021